Access Now is a non-profit organization founded in 2009 with a mission to defend and extend the digital civil rights of people around the world.  Access Now supports programs including an annual conference on Human Rights (RightsCon), an index of internet shutdowns (#KeepItOn), and providing exit nodes for Tor network.

, Access Now has legal entities in Belgium, Costa Rica, Tunisia, and the United States, with its staff, operations, and activities distributed across all regions of the world. In 2018, Access Now received approximately $5.1 million in funding.  Major funders included Facebook, Global Affairs Canada, the Dutch Ministry of Foreign Affairs, and the Swedish International Development Cooperation Agency.

History 
Access Now was founded by Brett Solomon, Cameran Ashraf, Sina Rabbani and Kim Pham in 2009, after the contested Iranian presidential election of that year. During the protests that followed this election, Access Now disseminated the video footage which came out of Iran. Access Now has campaigned against internet shutdowns, online censorship, international trade agreements, and government surveillance. Access Now has supported the use of encryption and limited cyber security laws and regulations.

Access Now runs an annual conference, RightsCon, a multi stakeholder event. The conference was first held in Silicon Valley in 2011, followed by events in Rio de Janeiro, Brazil (2012), Silicon Valley (2014), Manila, Philippines (2015), and Silicon Valley (2016), thus alternated between Silicon Valley and a city in the Global South. After being held in Brussels and Toronto, RightsCon 2019 took place in Tunis, Tunisia (1114 June). The 2019 RightsCon event gathered activists and stakeholders from all over the globe discussed the intersection between human rights and digitalisation by government representatives, tech giants, policy makers, NGOs and independent activists. The discussions were about hate speech and freedom of expression, artificial intelligence, privacy and data security, open government and democracy, access, and many others.  In 2020, RightsCon was to be held in San José, Costa Rica, for the COVID-19 pandemic, so the meeting took place in online format. In 2021, the 10th edition RightsCon was again held online from Monday June 7 to Friday June 11, 2021 due to continued global COVID-19 pandemic which altered several digital rights physical meetings. The topics for RightsCon2021 included: Artificial Intelligence (AI), automation, data protection and user control, digital futures, democracy, elections, new business models, content control, peace building, censorship, internet shutdowns, freedom of the media and many others was discussed by several digital rights organizations and individuals . In 2022, the 11th edition of RightsCon will take place entirely online across all time zones from Monday, June 6 to Friday, June 10, 2022.

#KeepItOn project 
Access Now makes an annual report and data set on internet shutdowns to track internet shutdowns, social media blockages, and internet slowdowns in countries around the world (part of the #KeepItOn project.)  This report and data are published annually every spring. Access Now  fights against online repression and provides grants and support to grassroots organizations to advance the rights of users and communities who are at risk of digital violations.

Methodology 
Access Now gathers data by Shutdown Tracker Optimization Project (STOP).  This project uses remotely sensed data to initially identify shutdowns, blockages and throttling. These instances gets confirmed using news reports, reports from local activists, official government statements, and statements from ISPs.  Internet shutdowns are said as "an intentional disruption of the internet or electronic communications rendering them inaccessible or effectively unusable, for a specific population or within a location, often to exert control over the flow of information." by Access Now.  Individual instances are counted if the shutdown lasts longer than one hour.

Access Now's data capture fewer false positives but more false negatives compared to expert analysis of internet shutdowns, such as V-Dem Institute's Digital Society Project, or Freedom House's Freedom on the Net. Access Now's data are more likely to miss shutdowns than captured by other methods

Impact 
#KeepItOn data is used to measure shutdowns by a range of organizations and academic publications.  For example, the Millennium Challenge Corporation uses these data as a part of its Freedom of Information indicator on its annual scorecards, used for determining aid allocations.  Access Now's reports are also used in calculations of the total cost of internet shutdowns.  Other articles use these data to track trends in internet censorship in various countries and regions.

Digital Security Helpline 
The organization offers a 24/7 advice to victims of cyber-crime such as cyber-attacks, spyware campaigns, data theft, and other digital malfeasance through its Helpline to protect citizens from digital attacks. Starting in 2009, It had offered support and direct technical advice to activists, journalists, and other human rights campaigners who are in need of digital security support, those facing cyber threats and attacks and those in need urgent support. The Digital Security Helpline was officially launched in 2013. Access Now claims to offer digital security guidance on topics such as; how to protect against data and credential theft and targeted cyber-attack campaigns.

The Helpline has been credited with helping to build people-first digital infrastructures, and one content moderation request at a time. Some have claimed that the helpline provides lessons on how to build comprehensive and sustainable digital infrastructures while protecting the digital rights of the people they serve. Its major focus is on protecting the digital well being of CSOs, activists, and human rights defenders. The rapid-response assistance includes working with individuals and CSOs around the world to provide emergency assistance and help them improve their digital security practices.

Some criticizes Access Now's methods of using in-country volunteers to identify attacks from their own government as unethical due to the risk it poses for those reporting via the Helpline and other reporting from government retribution.  While others have proposed automated systems to more ethically track these disruptions.

References

Digital rights organizations
Internet governance advocacy groups
International non-profit organizations
Organizations established in 2009
Internet-related organizations